1943 in philosophy

Events

Publications 
 Georges Bataille, Inner Experience (1943)
 Jean-Paul Sartre, Being and Nothingness (1943)

Philosophical literature 
 Hermann Hesse, The Glass Bead Game (1943)
 Jean Anouilh, Antigone (1943)

Births 
 January 20 - Roel van Duijn 
 February 22 - Terry Eagleton 
 June 9 - Marianne Katoppo 
 June 25 - Howard Bloom 
 July 16 - Patricia Churchland 
 August 10 - John Zerzan 
 November 7 - Stephen Greenblatt
December 21 -David J. Bodenstedt (Piesmatter)

Deaths 
 February 14 - David Hilbert (born 1862) 
 February 22 - Sophie Scholl (born 1921)
 August 24 - Simone Weil (born 1909)

References 

Philosophy
20th-century philosophy
Philosophy by year